The Hafidiya was a coup d'état in Morocco between 1907 and 1908 in which Abd al-Hafid seized power from his brother Abdelaziz. Abd al-Hafid started his movement in Marrakesh in the aftermath of the Algeciras Conference, the French occupation of Oujda and of Casablanca and the gaining the support of Amazigh leaders in the south. The Ulama of Fes supported Abdelhafid only with an unprecedented Conditioned Bay'ah, or pledge of allegiance.

Background 

The Algeciras Conference of 1906 had the effect of dividing Moroccans into supporters of either the Sultan Abdelaziz or his brother Abd al-Hafid into those calling for reform for jihad, respectively.

In May 1907, after France had occupied Oujda, the southern aristocrats, led by the head of the Glaoua tribe, Si Elmadani El Glaoui, invited Abd al-Hafid, an elder brother of Abdelaziz and viceroy at Marrakesh, to become sultan, and on August 16, 1907, after the bombardment and occupation of Casablanca, Abdelhafid was proclaimed sovereign in Marrakesh with all of the usual formalities.

In September, Abd-el-Aziz arrived at Rabat from Fez and endeavoured to secure the support of the European powers against his brother. From France, he accepted the grand cordon of the Légion d’honneur and was later enabled to negotiate a loan. That was seen as leaning to Christianity and aroused further opposition to his rule.

Conditioned Bay'ah 

In January 1908, the Ulama of Fes led by Muhammad al-Kattani declared Abdelaziz deposed and they imposed a conditioned bay'ah on Abd al-Hafid. The conditions for support included him to resume jihad, liberate Oujda and Casablanca, end the protégé system, restrict Europeans to port cities and consult the ummah in all major decisions.

Battle of Marrakesh 

Abdelaziz fled to Casablanca, then occupied by the French.

Press 
The French Arabic-language propaganda newspaper Es-Saada supported Abdelaziz and attacked supporters of Abd al-Hafid, including Ma al-'Aynayn and Muhammad Bin Abd al-Kabir al-Kattani. With French encouragement, supporters of Abdelaziz founded as-Sabaah in Tangier in 1904. 

In early 1908, Abd al-Hafid's Makhzen purchased Lisan al-Maghrib, an arabophone newspaper; it was run by two Lebanese brothers, Faraj-Allah and Artur Namor, and it printed open letters to Abdelaziz and then Abd al-Hafid.

In 1908, Abd al-Hafid ordered the creation of the newspaper al-Fajar, which would promote his views. It published its first edition on June 27, 1908.''

Aftermath 
The countries signatory to the Treaty of Algeciras informed Abd-al-Hafid in a letter dated September 14, 1908 that they would not recognize him as the legitimate head of Morocco unless he complied with the terms of the treaty signed by his predecessor.

References 

History of Morocco
1900s in Morocco
Military coups in Morocco
Civil wars